Saint-Andelain is a commune in the Nièvre department in central France.

It lies just a couple of km east of Pouilly-sur-Loire, famous for the wine known as Pouilly-Fumé.  Saint-Andelain sits on a hilltop and is surrounded by vineyards that are part of the Pouilly-Fumé wine region.  It is very picturesque when viewed from either the train running south from Paris to Nevers or from the new high-speed highway, A77.

See also
Communes of the Nièvre department

References

Communes of Nièvre